The Midland Pullman was the name given to a former express passenger train service operating on British Railways' old Midland Main Line between  and  via  and Millers Dale. The train completed the journey in 3 hours 15 minutes.

This service is not to be confused with the first Midland Railway Pullman coach introduced in 1874, named "Midland" which was of clerestory roofed design, imported from the Pullman Company in the US and assembled in Derby.

Blue Pullman
In July 1960 the Midland Pullman was relaunched as a luxury all-first-class service using two new Blue Pullman six-car diesel-electric units, aimed at covering the high end of the Manchester-London business market while services on the West Coast Main Line were disrupted during electrification. The best time between the two cities immediately previously had been 3 hours 50 minutes.

The Midland Pullman ran every weekday, up to London in the morning and down to Manchester in the evening. To fill in between these turns, there was an afternoon return trip from St Pancras to  described by railway staff as "The most luxurious ECS in the world." The train had two kitchens, and a full meal service was provided at every seat.

The operation attracted criticism because being a fixed-formation train it required a full spare set, making poor use of expensive assets. Critics also noted that the new service was not best timed for priority business use: initially the up Midland Pullman did not leave Manchester until 09:00.

Other commentators, however, praised the speed and smoothness of the journey and the luxury of the trains. Trains were later re-timed to suit business travellers better.

An attempt was made to find work for the train units on the East Coast Main Line but, plagued as they were by rough-riding bogies, they were never run in revenue-earning service.  The two units were eventually transferred to the Western Region to work alongside the Western Pullman units, which were eight-car units and included second class coaches.

Notes

See also
British Rail Classes 251 and 261
Pullman train (UK)

References

Named passenger trains of British Rail
Pullman Car Company (UK)